Talles may refer to:

 Talles (footballer) (born 1998), Brazilian footballer, full name Talles Brener de Paula, known as Talles
 Talles Costa (born 2002), Brazilian footballer, full name Talles Macedo Toledo Costa, known as Talles
 Thomas Tallis (1505–1585), English composer, also known as Talles

See also